In argumentation theory, a term is that part of a statement in an argument which refers to a specific thing. Usually, but not always expressed as a noun, one of the requirements to informally prove a conclusion with a deductive argument is for all its terms to be used unambiguously. The ambiguous use of a term in a deductive argument may be an instance of the fallacy of four terms.

Concepts in logic
Term logic